John Nelson Hinkle (January 11, 1854 – October 25, 1905) was the 34th mayor of Columbus, Ohio and the 31st person to serve in that office.   He was elected on April 1, 1901 and served Columbus for one term.  He sought re-election for a second term.  The opposing candidate, Republican nominee Robert H. Jeffrey, defeated incumbent mayor Hinkle.  Jeffrey took office on May 4, 1903.  He died on October 25, 1905.

References

Bibliography

External links

John Nelson Hinkle at Political Graveyard

Mayors of Columbus, Ohio
1854 births
1905 deaths
Burials at Green Lawn Cemetery (Columbus, Ohio)